Manuel Marroquín López (born October 25, 1993, in Bochil, Chiapas) is a Mexican professional footballer who plays for Alebrijes de Oaxaca of Ascenso MX.

External links

Living people
1993 births
Association football defenders
Atlante F.C. footballers
Dorados de Sinaloa footballers
Liga MX players
Ascenso MX players
Liga Premier de México players
Footballers from Chiapas
Mexican footballers